Arge ochropus, the rose sawfly, is a species belonging to the family Argidae subfamily Arginae.

Description 

The head and thorax are black, while the abdomen and wings are reddish orange. The larvae are yellow and bristly with black markings.

This species is very similar to Athalia rosae (Tenthredinidae), but in Arge ochropus the antennae are composed of three sections, the third of which is greatly elongated, while in Athalia rosae the antennae are composed of 10–11 items. Arge pagana is mainly black above.

Distribution 
This sawfly is present in Europe, Asia Minor, the Caucasus, Turkmenistan, Northern Iran and Western Siberia up to Lake Baikal. It has been introduced to the northeastern United States and Eastern Canada.

Ecology 
Adults feed of nectar and pollen on Tanacetum vulgare, Angelica sylvestris and Heracleum sphondylium. This species has two generations a year. The females lay about 16–18 eggs on the rose stems. Larvae feed on the leaves of some species of the genus Rosa, for example Rosa canina, Rosa majalis and Rosa pimpinellifolia.

References

External links 
 Biolib
 Fauna Europaea

Argidae
Insects described in 1790
Taxa named by Johann Friedrich Gmelin